Richard Jonathon Hall (born 27 September 1978) is an English cricketer.  Hall is a left-handed batsman who bowls slow left-arm orthodox.  He was born at Worcester, Worcestershire.

Hall made his debut for Herefordshire in the 1998 Minor Counties Championship against Devon.  From 1998 to 2009, he represented the county in 22 Championship matches, the last of which came against Cheshire.  His MCCA Knockout Trophy debut for the county came against the Worcestershire Cricket Board in 1998.  From 1998 to present, he has represented the county in 18 Trophy matches.  It was for Herefordshire that he made his only List A appearance, which came against Worcestershire in the 2004 Cheltenham & Gloucester Trophy.  In this match he made an unbeaten half century score of 54* and took a single catch in the field.

References

External links
Richard Hall at Cricinfo
Richard Hall at CricketArchive

1978 births
Living people
Sportspeople from Worcester, England
English cricketers
Herefordshire cricketers